The Faculty Hospital in Nitra is a hospital in the city of Nitra, in western Slovakia. Its address is Špitalská 6, 950 01, Nitra.

It is attached to the Constantine the Philosopher University in Nitra.

References 

Hospitals in Slovakia
Medical education in Slovakia
Teaching hospitals